Vostox apicedentatus, the toothed earwig, is a species of little earwig in the family Spongiphoridae. It is found in Central America and North America.

References

Further reading

 

Earwigs
Articles created by Qbugbot
Insects described in 1904